Kristopher Turner (born September 27, 1980) is a Canadian actor. He is best known for his role as Dr. Gavin Murphy on the medical drama series Saving Hope, and as Jamie Andrews on the CTV teen drama Instant Star.

Early life
Turner was born and raised in Winnipeg, Manitoba, Canada. He was introduced to the theater by his grandmother. Turner starred in his high school production of A Midsummer Night's Dream. Turner received a degree in theatre from the University of Winnipeg. He was active in a number of theatre productions including In Gabriel's Kitchen and That Face.

Career
In 2002, Turner landed a role in the children's series 2030 CE. He was cast in the lead role as Lex in director David DeCoteau's 2003 film The Brotherhood III: Young Demons. Following Turner's success in that film, he was cast in another leading role as Gus in the MTV movie Everybody's Doing It. Turner return to the theatre and appeared in a local Winnipeg theatrical production of Athol Fugard's Master Harold and the Boys. In 2004, Turner was cast as Jamie Andrews in the CTV teen drama series Instant Star, in which he stars for four seasons. He appeared in TV series Dark Oracle and in TV movie An Old Fashioned Thanksgiving. In 2007, he received a Gemini Awards nomination for Best Performance by an Actor in a Leading Role in a Dramatic Program or Mini-Series, for his role as Matt Blessing in A Dad for Christmas. 

After Instant Star, Turner appeared in the 2010 miniseries Bloodletting and Miraculous Cures as Winston and received another Gemini Awards nomination for Best Performance by an Actor in a Featured Supporting Role in a Dramatic Program or Mini-Series. He guest starred on Rookie Blue, The Listener, and Lost Girl. In 2012, he was cast as Cam on the series The L.A. Complex and at the same time joining the medical drama series Saving Hope as Dr. Gavin Murphy. Turner starred in the 2012 comedy horror film A Little Bit Zombie. In 2014, Turner played Eric in the Hallmark movie Love by the Book. He has appeared in stage performance in the play This is Our Youth, and received a Dora Award nomination for his role in Two Weeks, Twice a Year. In 2015, Turner was cast in the CBC drama series This Life as Oliver Lawson. 

Turner currently lives and studies in Toronto and Los Angeles.

Filmography

Film

Television

References

External links
 Kristopher Turner official website
 
 Kristopher Turner Twitter

1980 births
Living people
Canadian male film actors
Canadian male television actors
Male actors from Winnipeg